Architis is a genus of nursery web spiders that was first described by Eugène Louis Simon in 1898.

Species
 it contains twenty-one species, found only in South America, Panama, and on Trinidad:
Architis altamira Santos, 2007 – Brazil
Architis amazonica (Simon, 1898) – Brazil
Architis brasiliensis (Mello-Leitão, 1940) – Brazil
Architis capricorna Carico, 1981 – Brazil, Argentina
Architis catuaba Santos, 2008 – Brazil, Peru
Architis colombo Santos, 2007 – Brazil
Architis comaina Santos, 2007 – Peru
Architis cymatilis Carico, 1981 – Trinidad, Colombia to Brazil
Architis dianasilvae Santos, 2007 – Peru
Architis erwini Santos, 2007 – Ecuador
Architis fritzmuelleri Santos, 2007 – Brazil
Architis gracilis Santos, 2008 – Brazil
Architis helveola (Simon, 1898) – Colombia, Ecuador, Brazil
Architis ikuruwa Carico, 1981 – Guyana, Suriname, Peru, Bolivia
Architis maturaca Santos, 2007 – Brazil
Architis neblina Santos & Nogueira, 2008 – Brazil
Architis robusta Carico, 1981 – Panama, Brazil
Architis spinipes (Taczanowski, 1874) – Panama, Trinidad to Argentina
Architis tenuipes (Simon, 1898) – Brazil
Architis tenuis Simon, 1898 (type) – Panama to Brazil
Architis turvo Santos, 2007 – Brazil

See also
 List of Pisauridae species

References

Araneomorphae genera
Pisauridae
Spiders of Central America
Spiders of South America